Patrick Joseph Cahill (11 September 1884 – 12 November 1946) was an Irish Sinn Féin politician and newspaper editor.

Early life
He was born in Caherina, Tralee, County Kerry, to Timothy Cahill of Glenbeigh, and Mary Cahill (née Tangney) of Killorglin. He was educated at CBS Tralee and Blackrock College, Dublin, where he began a lifelong friendship with Éamon de Valera.

He played with the Kerry team which defeated Dublin in the 1904 All-Ireland Final, and in the Kerry team which lost to Kildare in the 1905 Final.

Irish Volunteers
In 1914 he joined the Tralee company of the Irish Volunteers. He was involved in the attempt to land arms from the Aud in April 1916, he was arrested after the Easter Rising and interned at various prisons until the general release of December 1916. He was rearrested in September 1917, and not released until February 1919.

He was leader of the Kerry 1st Brigade of the Irish Republican Army. His units operated in and around Tralee during the Irish War of Independence.

Politics
Due mainly to his status in the Volunteers, he was chosen to run unopposed as a Sinn Féin Teachta Dála (TD) to the 2nd Dáil at the 1921 elections for the Kerry–Limerick West constituency. 

He opposed the Anglo-Irish Treaty and voted against it. He was re-elected unopposed as an anti-Treaty Sinn Féin TD to the 3rd Dáil at the 1922 general election though he did not take his seat. During the Irish Civil War, he was a member of anti-treaty forces, and took part in the defence of Tralee and later assumed command of a Dingle column. He was arrested and interned, and  went on a forty-two-day hunger strike. He was elected as a Sinn Féin TD at the 1923 general election for the Kerry constituency. He did not stand in the June 1927 general election.

Later life
In 1928, he became founding editor and managing director of the Kerry Champion. He never married and died on 12 November 1946 at the Bon Secour Nursing Home, Tralee.

References

 

1884 births
1946 deaths
Early Sinn Féin TDs
Members of the 2nd Dáil
Members of the 3rd Dáil
Members of the 4th Dáil
People of the Irish Civil War (Anti-Treaty side)
Politicians from County Kerry
Kerry inter-county Gaelic footballers
People educated at Blackrock College